Russell "Red" Steagall (born December 22, 1938) is an American actor, musician, poet, and stage performer, who focuses on American Western and country music genres.

Early life and day jobs
He was born in Gainesville, Texas, United States. He became a bull rider at rodeos while he was still a teenager, but at the age of 15, he was stricken with polio. He took up the guitar and the mandolin as physical therapy to recover the strength and dexterity of his arms and hands. Based out of Amarillo, he formed a dance band, Russell Don & The Premiers making his first recordings (which were unreleased) at Norman Petty Studios in Clovis, New Mexico, in April 1961. Steagall entered a career in agricultural chemistry after graduating from West Texas State University with a degree in animal science and agronomy. After five years spent as a soil analyst for Sand Mark Oil, Steagall then spent eight years as a music industry executive in Hollywood, and has spent the last 40 years as a recording artist, songwriter, and television and motion picture personality. He currently maintains offices outside of Fort Worth, where he is involved in the production of motion pictures and television shows.

On December 28, 1974, Hee Haw season six, episode 16, Steagall saluted his hometown of Sanford, Texas, population 181.

Television and radio personality
Steagall made numerous appearances on syndicated television shows such as Hee Haw and Nashville on the Road. He also spent four years as host of the nationally televised National Finals Rodeo, was host of the Winston Pro Tour on ESPN for the 1985 season, and co-hosted the College National Finals Rodeo for the Freedom Sports Network from 1988 through 1991. He was also the host of Western Theater on America One Television.

Steagall currently hosts a one-hour syndicated radio show, Cowboy Corner, on 170 stations in 43 states. Cowboy Corner celebrates the lifestyle of the American West through the poems, songs, and stories of the American cowboy. In 2010, In the Bunkhouse with Red Steagall began airing on the RFD-TV network; as of 2017, Steagall now hosts Red Steagall is Somewhere West of Wall Street for the same channel. His down-home, friendly manner and considerable musical talents make him a favorite of rural America.

Motion pictures 
Steagall had a major role in the motion picture Benji the Hunted, which was released in the summer of 1987. He also appeared in the motion pictures Dark Before Dawn and Abilene. He produced the motion picture Big Bad John, starring Jimmy Dean, Jack Elam, Ned Beatty, and Bo Hopkins, and directed by Burt Kennedy.

Steagall is a trustee of the Pro Rodeo Hall of Champions, honorary member of the Cowboy Artists of America, and former board chairman of the Academy of Country Music.

Musical and literary accomplishments 
Along with Don Lanier, in 1966, Steagall co-wrote the song "Here We Go Again", most notably recorded by Ray Charles.

In 1975, he discovered a then-unknown Reba McEntire and signed her to Mercury Records the following year. He discovered her while she was performing the national anthem at the National Rodeo Finals competition in Oklahoma City, Oklahoma. One year later, in October 1977, McEntire released her first album on Mercury Records, and though most of her Mercury albums were commercial failures, in 1984, she picked up with her big album, My Kind of Country.

In March 1993, Texas Christian University Press published Steagall's first book, entitled Ride for the Brand, a 168-page collection of poetry and songs embracing the Western lifestyle. The book is illustrated by Cowboy Artists of America members Bill Owen, Fred Fellows, Joe Beeler, and Howard Terpning.

In September 2003, Texas Tech University Press published Born to This Land, a joint effort between Steagall and Pulitzer Prize-winning photographer Skeeter Hagler. The book contains Hagler's black-and-white studies of modern ranching, accompanied by Steagall's award-winning poetry. The Academy of Western Artists named Born to This Land' as recipient of the Will Rogers Award for best book of 2003.

Steagall has won the Wrangler Award for original music five times: 1993 (for his Warner Western album, Born to This Land), 1995 (for the Warner Western album, Faith and Values), 1997 (for his Warner Western album, Dear Mama, I'm a Cowboy), 1999 (for Love of the West). In fall 2002, Steagall released his 20th album, Wagon Tracks, which also won the Wrangler Award from the National Cowboy and Western Heritage Museum.

He released his new album Here We Go Again in August 2007. Here We Go Again features duets with Toby Keith, Reba McEntire, Charley Pride, Ray Benson, Neal McCoy, Larry Gatlin, and Charlie Daniels.

In May 2011, Bunkhouse Press released Steagall's CD Dreamin' of......When the Grass Was Still Deep'', featuring eight songs and two poems.

Honors and awards 
The Texas Legislature named Red Steagall the Official Cowboy Poet of Texas in April 1991. Steagall was an early participant in the American Cowboy Culture Association, which holds the annual National Cowboy Symposium and Celebration each September in Lubbock.

Steagall is also the official Cowboy Poet Laureate of San Juan Capistrano, California.

Since 1991, Steagall has hosted the annual Red Steagall Cowboy Gathering in the Stockyards National Historic District of Fort Worth. The event features a ranch rodeo, chuckwagon cookoff, children's poetry contest, Western swing dances, cowboy music and poetry, a trappings show, and horsemanship clinics.

In 1999, Steagall was inducted into the Texas Trail of Fame.

In April 2003, Steagall was inducted into the Hall of Great Westerners at the National Cowboy and Western Heritage Museum in Oklahoma City, joining the likes of Will Rogers, Theodore Roosevelt, Charles Goodnight, and Charlie Russell.

In January 2004, he received the Spirit of Texas Award and was inducted into the Texas Cowboy Hall of Fame in Fort Worth.

In April 2005, he was inducted to the Texas Rodeo Cowboy Hall of Fame in Belton, Texas.

Red Steagall was named "2006 Poet Laureate of the State of Texas" at the Capital in Austin in the spring of 2005. Steagall is the first "cowboy" poet to be named the poet laureate of Texas.

In 2003, he was inducted into the Hall of Great Westerners of the National Cowboy & Western Heritage Museum.

Discography

Albums

Singles

References

External links
 
Red Steagall Ranch Headquarters!
Red Steagall www.CowboyPoetry.com
Red Steagall's Cowboy Corner Radio show

People from San Juan Capistrano, California
People from Gainesville, Texas
1938 births
Living people
American country singer-songwriters
Poets Laureate of Texas
Cowboy poets
Rodeo in the arts
Singer-songwriters from Texas
Singer-songwriters from California
Country musicians from California
Country musicians from Texas